The 2012 Campeonato Internacional de Verano, also known as 2012 Copa Bimbo for sponsoring purposes, is the fourth edition of the Campeonato Internacional de Verano, an exhibition international club football competition that featured two clubs from Uruguay (Nacional and Peñarol), one from Peru (Universidad San Martín) and one from Chile (Palestino). It is played in Montevideo, Uruguay at the Estadio Centenario from 13 to 15 January 2012.

Bracket

Matches

Semi-finals

Third place

Final

Man of the match:
 Emiliano Albín
Assistant referees:
 Carlos Pastorino
 Raúl Hartwig
Fourth official:
 Gustavo Siegler

Scorers
2 goals
 Emiliano Albín (Peñarol)
 Santiago Silva (Peñarol)
 David Llanos (Palestino)

1 goal
 Héber Arriola (Universidad San Martín)
 Sebastián Cristóforo (Peñarol)
 Joaquín Boghossián (Nacional)
 Luis Perea (Universidad San Martín)
 Álvaro Recoba (Nacional)
 Matías Vecino (Nacional)
 Nicolás Canales (Palestino)

External links

2012
2012 in Peruvian football
Copa
2012 in Chilean football